Horst Beyer (5 January 1940 – 9 December 2017) was a German decathlete who competed at the 1964 and 1972 Summer Olympics. In 1966, he earned a bronze medal at the European Athletics Championships. Beyer died at the age of 77 in 2017, at a hospital in Hamburg.

References

External links

1940 births
2017 deaths
West German decathletes
People from Neumünster
Olympic athletes of West Germany
Olympic athletes of the United Team of Germany
Athletes (track and field) at the 1964 Summer Olympics
Athletes (track and field) at the 1972 Summer Olympics
European Athletics Championships medalists
Sportspeople from Schleswig-Holstein